David Diaan, also known as David Davoodian, is a Los Angeles–based actor, writer, producer, and entrepreneur. He is best known for his satirical plays and his hilarious approach to issues surrounding the Iranian American community in the USA. He is an avid humanitarian and activist, especially in respect to the struggles of the freedom seeking citizens of his homeland, Iran.

Early life
He was born Fariborz Davoodian in Iran during the era of Shah Mohammad Reza Pahlavi. His father, Elias Davoodian, was a textile distributor who had built a reputation as a trustworthy businessman. As a hobby, David's father Elias, would produce and act in community theater productions and was quite popular in his small town in Iran. His mother, Eshrat Moluk, was born into a family of prominent physicians. As a young girl, she possessed a gift for singing, but her strict parents never allowed her to perform professionally. His parents' appreciation of performing arts were an early influence on Diaan's aspirations in the entertainment industry.

Education and career
At the age of 16, Diaan left Iran and moved to Columbia, Missouri in the Midwestern United States to continue his education. There, he attended David H. Hickman High School. Afterwards, he went on the study Radio, Television and Journalism at the prestigious University of Missouri. However, David's ambitions of returning to his homeland to become a famous talk show host were postponed due to the sudden changes in the social and political climate of his country after the Iranian Revolution. Iran and the United States had at this point become enemies. Left virtually stranded away from home, David took a job as a marketing agent for a national houseware wholesaler to earn his tuition money. Prior to finishing college, David had already established himself as successful young entrepreneur. Soon after, he moved to Los Angeles, California and co-founded The Express Group, Inc. which later transformed into deliverLA.com. Among his other entrepreneurial endeavors is his partnership in SOGOLI, Inc., a company which designs and manufactures high end custom jewelry in the United States and exports to various countries.

Artistic career
Diaan's experience in the entertainment industry began when he started "Liquid Productions" in Los Angeles, California together with other talents such as now well-known comedian Maz Jobrani. This young group wrote and produced the first Iranian/American play in English which became an instant hit amongst the younger generation.His popular theater company which produced successful shows such as The Belind Date, The 99 Cent Family and Death Comedy has toured across the United States and Canada. Since then, Diaan has written and produced multiple theatrical plays, hosted his own popular radio show on KIRN 670 AM, and produced and hosted a television show for channel one TV named “It's a mad mad mad mad world". His television show reached millions of Iranians worldwide through satellite and internet.

Despite the risks attached to this journey, Diaan returned to his homeland after 24 years in the summer of 2000, to direct and produce the touching and informative documentary Iran is My Home. This film was an official selection at the IFP Los Angeles Film Festival. In 2004 he took his first stab at screenplay writing for a feature film entitled The Apology. The screenplay won first prize at the Slamdance Film Festival's screenplay competition. Diaan's production company, Sublime Entertainment, has produced independent feature films such as Otis E. starring Kevin Durand and Peter Storemare, America So Beautiful and The Dogwalker. Diaan's dramatic performance alongside Academy Award nominee, Shohreh Aghdashloo in The Stoning of Soraya M., earned him high praise and excellent reviews. In 2012, his performance as prime minister Mossadegh, in a film by the same title, earned him the best actor prize at the San Antonio Film Festival.

Personal life
Diaan resides in Los Angeles, California with his family.
He travels with his theater group to different cities and communities across the United States and Canada.
He also contributes much of his time and talent to various charitable organizations.

Filmography

Television

References

External links
 [./Https://www.mrsublime.com Sublimeentertainment.com]
 

Year of birth missing (living people)
American male actors
American male writers
Film producers from Missouri
Iranian emigrants to the United States
University of Missouri alumni
Writers from Columbia, Missouri
Living people
American writers of Iranian descent
Actors from Columbia, Missouri
Businesspeople from Columbia, Missouri